Sülldorf railway station in Hamburg, Germany, is located on the extended Altona-Blankenese line and is served by the trains of the Hamburg S-Bahn.

The rapid transit trains of the line S1 of the Hamburg S-Bahn call the station in the Sülldorf quarter of the Altona borough in Hamburg.

History
When the steam railway line to Wedel was opened on 1 December 1883, also a station in the small farmer's village of Sülldorf was established. It was then also used for freight traffic and had 3 tracks. After electrification of the line to Sülldorf, which was completed on 14 May 1950, the third track north of the station was removed. The platform was fully renovated in 2013.

Station layout
The station is an at-grade station with an island platform and 2 tracks. It is the only S-Bahn station in Hamburg which can only be accessed over a pedestrian level crossing. Next to it the smallest semaphore of Hamburg can be found. Also there is still the mechanical signal box called "Sdf" in operation, which was built in 1927. There is no service personnel attending the station, but an SOS and information telephone is available. There are some places to lock a bicycle as well as a few parking spots. The station is fully accessible for handicapped persons. There are no lockerboxes.

Services
On track no. 1 the trains in direction Wedel and on track no. 2 the trains in direction Hamburg center and toward Airport/Poppenbüttel call the station. A bus stop in front of the railway station is called by metro bus line 1 and night bus lines 601 and 621.

See also

Hamburger Verkehrsverbund (HVV) (Public transport association in Hamburg)

References

External links
DB station information 

Hamburg S-Bahn stations in Hamburg
Buildings and structures in Altona, Hamburg
Railway stations in Germany opened in 1883